Gaius Julius Sampsiceramus (78 or 79 AD), "from the Fabia tribe, also known as Seilas, son of Gaius Julius Alexion," was the builder of a mausoleum that formerly stood in the necropolis of Tell Abu Sabun (in modern-day Homs, Syria), as recorded on an inscription said to have belonged to the monument. His relatedness to the Sampsigeramids (the Emesene dynasty of priest-kings) has been deemed possible, probable, or has even been accepted, in which case through Gaius Julius Alexion.

According to Maurice Sartre, the owner's Roman citizenship, attested by his tria nomina, strongly supports relatedness to the royal family. The lack of allusion to royal kinship is best explained if the dynasty had been deprived of its kingdom shortly before the mausoleum was built and the said kingdom had been annexed to the Roman province of Syria, which occurred very likely between 72 and the construction of the mausoleum. As worded by Andreas Kropp, "what the builder was really keen on stressing is that he was a Roman citizen bearing the tria nomina."

References

Sources 

 
 
 
 
 
 
 

People of Roman Syria
1st-century Romans
Year of birth unknown
Sampsiceramus, Gaius
1st-century people
Emesene dynasty